John Boscoe Waigo (born 16 July 1967) is a Ugandan boxer. He competed in the men's light middleweight event at the 1988 Summer Olympics.

References

1967 births
Living people
Ugandan male boxers
Olympic boxers of Uganda
Boxers at the 1988 Summer Olympics
Place of birth missing (living people)
Light-middleweight boxers